Kyösti Kallio's third cabinet was the 17th government of Republic of Finland. Cabinet's time period was from 16 August 1929 to 4 July 1930. It was Majority government only formed by the Agrarian League. 
 

 

Kallio, 3
1929 establishments in Finland
1930 disestablishments in Finland
Cabinets established in 1929
Cabinets disestablished in 1930